The  is an inactive professional wrestling championship in the Japanese promotion DDT Pro-Wrestling. The title was established in 2005 and was only contested in its inaugural match, in Tōno, Iwate. The belt, presented by the mayor Toshiaki Honda, was made from a jingisukan pan, a dish said to have originated in Tōno.

Title history
726 was crowned the first champion after he beat Cherry and Tomohiko Hashimoto on August 20, 2005. Since then, the title has never been defended, nor has it been officially deactivated.

Reigns

See also

DDT Pro-Wrestling
Professional wrestling in Japan

References

DDT Pro-Wrestling championships
Openweight wrestling championships